Keith "KJ" Stroud (born December 20, 1989) is a former  American football wide receiver He was signed by the New York Jets as an undrafted free agent in 2013. He played college football at Rutgers before transferring to Bethune-Cookman for his final two seasons. KJ is currently the Wide Receivers and Special Teams Coordinator at Lock Haven University.

Early years 

He was selected to All-City and All-State teams while at high school. He was named to the Brooklyn Big 44 team while at high school.

College career 

He played college football at Rutgers for his Freshman and Sophomore season then transferred to Bethune-Cookman for his Junior and Senior seasons. While at Rutgers for his Freshman and Sophomore seasons, he had a total of 17 Receptions, 169 Receiving yards and no touchdowns.

Professional career

New York Jets 

On April 27, 2013, he signed with the New York Jets as an undrafted free agent following the 2013 NFL Draft. He was released on August 26, 2013.<

Toronto Argonauts 

On February 24, 2014, Stroud signed with the Toronto Argonauts of the Canadian Football League. He was released by the Argonauts on June 22, 2014.

Spokane Shock 

On November 17, 2014, Stroud was assigned to the Spokane Shock of the Arena Football League. He was placed on reassignment on April 1, 2015.

New Orleans VooDoo 
On May 14, 2015, Stroud was assigned to the New Orleans VooDoo. After starting in a single game, Stroud was targeted 3 times, but did not catch a pass. Stroud was placed on reassignment on May 18, 2015.

References

External links 
Bethune-Cookman Wildcats bio
Toronto Argonauts bio

1989 births
Living people
Rutgers Scarlet Knights football players
Bethune–Cookman Wildcats football players
New York Jets players
Spokane Shock players
New Orleans VooDoo players
Fort Hamilton High School alumni